Caphys fovealis is a species of snout moth in the genus Caphys. It was described by George Hampson in 1897, and is known from Brazil.

References

Moths described in 1897
Chrysauginae